Pigeonberry or pigeon berry is a common name for several flowering plants and may refer to:

Amelanchier alnifolia, native to North America
Duranta erecta
Phytolacca americana
Rivina humilis